Innova Champion Discs Inc., generally known simply as Innova (stylized as INNOVA) is an American disc golf brand and manufacturing company. Founded in 1983, it is the largest disc golf disc manufacturer and was among the first companies to produce equipment specifically for disc golf.

History 

The company was incorporated on 5 May 1983 in California as Champion Discs Inc. In 1983, Dave Dunipace created and patented the Eagle, the world's first disc designed specifically for the sport of disc golf.

Products 

In addition to discs, Innova manufactures other disc golfing equipment including bags, accessories, and their DISCatcher targets, which were introduced in 1995. Their 60+ golf discs are manufactured using various molds and plastics. Innova manufactures discs in 4 distinct lines of plastic with distinct flight characteristics: Star, Champion, Pro, and DX. There are also many subtypes related to the main 4: Echo Star, Gstar, Starlite, Champion Edition, Blizzard Champion, Glow Champion, R-Pro, XT-Pro, KC-Pro, KC-Glow, McPro, JK-Pro, Yeti-Pro Proline and Glow DX.

Current models 
Distance drivers

 Ape
 Archon
 Beast
 Boss
 Colossus
 Corvette
 Charger
 Daedalus
 Destroyer
 Dominator
 Firebird
 Firestorm sand
 Groove
 Invictus
 Katana
 Krait
 Mamba
 Monarch
 Mystere
 Orc
 Roadrunner
 Savant
 Shryke
 Sidewinder
 Teedevil
 Tern
 Thunderbird
 Valkyrie
 Viking
 Vulcan
 Wahoo
 Wraith
 Xcaliber

Fairway drivers

 Archangel
 Banshee
 Cheetah
 Dragon
 Eagle
 Leopard
 Leopard3
 Teebird
 Teebird3
 TL
 TL3
 Viper

Midrange

 Atlas
 Avatar
 Caiman
 Cobra
 Gator
 Kite
 Lion
 Mako
 Mako3
 Manta
 Panther
 Rat
 Roc
 Roc3
 RocX3
 Shark
 Skeeter
 Spider
 Stingray
 Vroc
 Wolf
 Wombat
 Wombat3

Putt & approach

 Aviar
 Aviar3
 AviarX3
 Birdie
 Bullfrog
 Classic Aviar
 Colt
 Dart
 Firefly
 Hydra
 Invader
 JK Aviar
 KC Aviar
 Mirage
 Nova
 Pig
 Polecat
 Rhyno
 Stud
 Wedge
 Whale
 Xero
 Yeti Aviar

Disc ratings 

Innova uses a numeric scale to rate the performance of its discs.  The ratings represent:

 Speed - Speed is the rating of the throw speed which is required to throw the disc on the line the other flight numbers suggest, and is largely determined by the thickness of the rim, with 2.6 cm being the thickest allowed for PDGA approved play, but it has also been described as how easily the disc cuts through the air. Ratings range from 1 to 14, with 14 being the "fastest" drivers and 1 being the "slowest" putt and approach discs.
Glide - Rated from 1 to 7, Innova describes glide as "the discs ability to maintain loft during flight. Discs with more glide are best for new players, and for producing maximum distance. Beginners wanting more distance should choose discs with more glide. Discs with less glide are more accurate in high wind situations".  A disc with a glide of 1 will be relatively unaffected by winds and will tend to fly on the thrower's power more than anything, while a disc with a glide of 7 will be very sensitive to crosswinds and headwinds, but will ride a tailwind much further than it could be thrown via force alone.
 Turn - The turn of a disc (also known as high speed stability) describes how hard a disc will fight against its natural inclination to fade (see below) during the flight. Turn is rated from -5 to +1. A -5 rated disc will turn from a straight line of flight very easily with relatively little power behind it, while a +1 is unlikely to turn at all and will usually begin fading earlier in the flight.
 Fade - The fade of a disc (also known as low speed stability) is the degree to which a disc will fall to one side as it loses speed. The direction of the fade depends on how it is thrown. For example, for a right handed person throwing in the traditional backhand style, the disc will fade to the left, but when thrown forehand, it will fade to the right. Fade is rated from 0 to 5, with a 5 rated disc fading hard and early, and a 0 rated disc barely fading off of its original line of flight at all.

Innova Factory Store 

In 2011, Innova opened the online Innova Factory Store and a brick and mortar pro shop in Rancho Cucamonga, California. In addition to stock production discs, gear, and apparel, it carries limited edition discs, prototypes, out of production models, and a variety of factory seconds stamped with an F2 label.

Sponsored players 
Innova sponsors a wide variety of athletes worldwide, from junior athletes to elite professional players. Below is a list of the 10 classes of players sponsored by Innova and affectuously called the "Innova Air Force," :

See also 
 List of disc golf brands and manufacturers
 Innova Disc Golf (video game)

References

External links 
 
 

Sporting goods manufacturers of the United States
Disc golf equipment manufacturers